Joseph William Jones (10 March 1900 – 18 March 1988), known as Bill Jones, was a British trade unionist.

Born in Bethnal Green, Jones joined the British Army early in World War I, while still underage.  His mother obtained his release, but he rejoined in 1917, and continued to serve in the army until 1920.  After a succession of short-term jobs, in 1925 he became a bus conductor and joined the Transport and General Workers' Union (TGWU).

During the UK general strike of 1926, Jones distributed the British Worker, the Trade Union Congress' bulletin, and he drove busses into obscure streets in order that strikebreakers would struggle to locate them.  By the 1930s, Jones had joined the Communist Party of Great Britain (CPGB) and the Rank and File Movement of London busworkers, becoming its secretary in 1935.  In this role, he criticised TGWU General Secretary Ernest Bevin for not supporting the Republicans in the Spanish Civil War.

In 1937, the London busworkers went on strike, calling for reduced working hours.  Bevin ended the strike, against their wishes, and then expelled Jones and other leading figures in the Rank and File Movement - including Bert Papworth - when they did not immediately return to work.  However, while some of his expelled colleagues joined the rival National Passenger Workers' Union, Jones denounced it.  Support within the TGWU for his position led to his readmittance in 1938.  Within a year, he was elected to the General Executive Council of the union, and he was able to secure a new position as a bus driver.

Jones served the union during World War II, opposing industrial action during the period.  In 1950, the TGWU banned communists from holding official positions in the union; he lost his position on the Executive Committee, and helped set up the Campaign for Trade Union Democracy to oppose the ban.  While he remained a member of the CPGB and served on its London District Committee, in practice all his time was devoted to trade union activity.  He left the party in 1956, following Krushchev's denunciation of Stalin, and quickly regained a position on the union executive.

Jones was elected as chair of the TGWU executive, and from 1967 to 1969 also served on the General Council of the Trades Union Congress.  He then retired, but became chair of the British Peace Committee and also active in the National Pensioners Convention.

References

1900 births
1988 deaths
British Army personnel of World War I
Communist Party of Great Britain members
Trade unionists from London
Members of the General Council of the Trades Union Congress
People from Bethnal Green
Child soldiers in World War I